The Department of Parks and Wildlife (DPaW) was the department of the Government of Western Australia responsible for managing lands described in the Conservation and Land Management Act 1984 and implementing the state's conservation and environment legislation and regulations. The minister responsible for the department was the Minister for the Environment.

History
The Department of Environment and Conservation (DEC) was separated on 30 June 2013, forming the Department of Parks and Wildlife (DPaW) and the Department of Environment Regulation (DER), both of which commenced operations on 1 July 2013.

DPaW focused on managing multiple use state forests, national parks, marine parks and reserves. DER focused on environmental regulation, approvals and appeals processes, and pollution prevention.

It was announced on 28 April 2017 that the Department of Parks and Wildlife would merge with the Botanic Gardens and Parks Authority, the Zoological Parks Authority and the Rottnest Island Authority on 1 July 2017 to form the Department of Biodiversity, Conservation and Attractions.

Status (at dissolution, 30 June 2017)

The Department of Parks and Wildlife had management responsibilities in:
 nature reserves (10,267,826 ha)
 100 national parks (6,267,602 ha) 
 19 conservation parks (1,084,346 ha)
 17 marine parks (4,307,613 ha)
 1 marine nature reserve (132,000 ha)
 2 marine management areas (143,000 ha)
 State forests (1,309,755 ha)  and
 other lands and waters throughout the state

At 30 June 2017, the total area under Parks and Wildlife's care was 31,480,868 ha. The land area managed by the department was about 10.6 per cent of the land area of Western Australia.

The lands and waters managed by the department received in 2014-15 18.6 million visits a year, with visitor satisfaction at a high level of 89%. The average level of visitor satisfaction with their visit on Parks & Wildlife lands and waters was of 91.4% in 2015–16. Western Australian national parks and reserves received 20 million visits in a single year for the first time in 2016–17 and a visitor satisfaction level of 92.5 per cent. Each year Parks and Wildlife aimed for a satisfaction rating above 85 per cent, a figure it had achieved for more than 10 consecutive years.

10,910 people were registered volunteers with the department in 2014-15 that helped in a range of projects across the State with 610,000 hours contributed. During 2015–16,  5,189 active volunteers of the total 13,737 registered individuals contributed 638,747 voluntary hours to more than 200 Parks and Wildlife environmental and recreational programs. In 2016–17, Parks and Wildlife's volunteers have contributed to a record number of hours to help conserve and manage WA's natural places, with 5,410 volunteers contributing 723,508 hours.

Parks and Wildlife was responsible for the wildlife conservation project Western Shield, a pest animal and weed control program that included 4 million hectares of conservation reserves and State forests baited for feral animal control, as well as weed control on more than 89 million hectares of unallocated Crown land and unmanaged reserves.

There are a number of internationally recognised biodiversity hotspots within Western Australia and in particular in the south west of the state.

Parks and Wildlife also managed two long-distance trails: the 1,000 km Bibbulmun Track for walkers, and the 1,000 km Munda Biddi Trail for cyclists.

An important duty of the Department (with the help of the Forest Products Commission crews) was to be responsible for bushfire prevention and suppression on its lands as well as fire prevention in unallocated Crown land and unmanaged reserves. This included conducting controlled burns to reduced fuel load, and research into the behaviour and effects of bushfires.

More than 247,360 hectares were prescribed burnt in the three forest regions during the 2016-17 financial year, in addition to the significant burns that have been undertaken by staff in the South Coast, Goldfields, Wheatbelt, Mid West, Pilbara and Kimberley regions up to 2,988,394 hectares.

Some of the most severe West Australian bushfires that the department had to suppress, in chronological order, include:

Preceding agencies
Earlier forms of Nature conservation in Western Australia were under:
 Department of Lands and Surveys: 1 January 1890 - (partly split) 31 December 1895
 Wood and Forests Department: 1 January 1896 – 31 December 1918
 Forests Department: 1 January 1919 – 21 March 1985
 State Gardens Board:    15 December 1920 – 30 April 1957  (Parks and Reserves Act 1895)
 National Parks Board:    1 May 1957 – 30 July 1977
 Department of Fisheries and Fauna: 1 October 1964 – 31 December 1973
 National Parks Authority:       1 August 1977 – 15 April 1985  (National Parks Authority Act 1976)
 Wildlife section of the Department of Fisheries and Wildlife: 1 January 1974 – 21 March 1985 
 Department of Conservation and Land Management (CALM):     22 March 1985 – 30 June 2006  (Conservation and Land Management Act 1984)
 Department of Environment and Conservation (DEC):     1 July 2006 – 30 June 2013
 Swan River Trust: 1989 (Swan and Canning Rivers Management Act 2006) - 1 July 2015

Vehicles
The department maintained and coordinated a range of specialist equipment and emergency response vehicles. This included pumpers and tankers and other equipment relating to operations involving search and rescue and firefighting.

Uniforms and equipment
The Department of Parks and Wildlife had three types of uniforms:
 a standard khaki and bottle green uniform with appropriate badging was supplied to and worn by staff whose duties included the monitoring of legislative compliance (National Park and Marine Rangers, Conservation and Land Management Officers, Forest Officers, Wildlife Officers and Authorised CALM Officers under Bush Fire Act),
 a work wear (khaki and bottle green only with generic badge) for those that worked in the field and personal protective equipment or clothing (TecaSafe gold overshirt, TecaSafe dark green trousers and vest, Kevlar helmet with goggles, gloves, belt and fire boots) for staff who were involved in fire management activities,
 a corporate apparel worn by employees who were in regular contact with the public or members of other departments (sand, grey or white shirt, black trousers).

Notes

External links
 Department of Parks and Wildlife (Western Australia)
 Department of Environment Regulation

Nature conservation in Western Australia
Forests of Western Australia
2013 establishments in Australia
2017 disestablishments in Australia
Western Australia
Statutory agencies of Western Australia
Parks
Environmental agencies in Australia
Western Australia